The Deputy Chief of the Defence Staff is a senior British military officer who reports to the Chief of the Defence Staff and Vice-Chief of the Defence Staff.

Early Deputy Chiefs of the Defence Staff
These were:
1957 – 1960 – Lieutenant-General Sir Roderick McLeod
1960 – 1962 – Air Marshal Sir Alfred Earle
1962 – 1964 – Lieutenant-General Sir Denis O’Connor
Note: This single "Deputy Chief" role was redesignated Vice-Chief of the Defence Staff after 1964.

Current arrangements
There are currently three people with the post of Deputy Chief of the Defence Staff (DCDS) at any one time. These are:

Deputy Chief of the Defence Staff (Military Strategy and Operations) 
Deputy Chief of the Defence Staff (Military Capability)
Chief of Defence People

Deputy Chief of the Defence Staff (Military Strategy and Operations)
In 1989–91, the Defence Operations Executive, led by the Deputy Chief of the Defence Staff (Commitments) and including the Assistant Chiefs of the Naval, General, and Air Staffs, supervised the Joint Operations Centre which in turn passed orders to the forces in Cyprus, Belize, the Falklands, and Hong Kong. These commands consisted of units of all three services and were commanded by one or 2-star rank flag officers. Commander British Forces (CBF) British Forces Cyprus was a rotational post between the Army and RAF, at two-star level; CBF British Forces Belize was an Army brigadier; CBF Falklands was a rotational post between all three services at two-star level; and CBF Hong Kong was an Army major general.

These were:
Deputy Chief of the Defence Staff (Commitments)
1985 – 1987 Vice-Admiral Sir John Woodward
1987 – 1989 Lieutenant-General Sir Antony Walker
1989 – 1992 Air Marshal Sir Kenneth Hayr
1992 – 1995 Vice-Admiral the Hon. Sir Nicholas Hill-Norton
1995 – 1997 Lieutenant-General Sir Alexander Harley
1997 – 2000 Air Marshal Sir John Day
2000 – 2003 Lieutenant-General Sir Anthony Pigott
2003 – 2006 Lieutenant-General Sir Robert Fry
2006 – 2007 Vice-Admiral Charles Style
2007 – 2009 Lieutenant-General Sir Peter Wall

Current title: Deputy Chief of Defence Staff (Military Strategy & Operations)
2009 – 2011 Lieutenant-General Simon Mayall
2011 – 2013 Lieutenant-General Richard Barrons
2013 – 2014 Lieutenant-General James Everard
2014 – 2016 Lieutenant-General Gordon Messenger
2016 – 2018 Lieutenant-General Mark Carleton-Smith
2018 – 2021 Lieutenant General Douglas Chalmers
2021 – present Lieutenant General Sir Roland Walker

Deputy Chiefs of the Defence Staff (Personnel and Training) / Deputy Chiefs of the Defence Staff (People)/Chief of Defence People
These were:
Deputy Chief of the Defence Staff (Programmes and Personnel)
1984 – 1987 Lieutenant-General Sir John Chapple
1987 – 1989 Air Marshal Sir David Parry-Evans
1989 – 1992 Vice-Admiral Sir Barry Wilson
1992 – 1996 Lieutenant-General the Hon. Sir Thomas Boyd-Carpenter
1996 – 1999 Air Marshal Sir Peter Squire

Deputy Chief of the Defence Staff (Personnel)
1999 – 2002 Air Marshal Sir Malcolm Pledger
2002 – 2005 Lieutenant-General Anthony Palmer
2005 – 2007 Air Marshal David Pocock
2007 – 2010 Vice-Admiral Peter Wilkinson

Deputy Chief of the Defence Staff (Personnel and Training)
2010 – 2013 Lieutenant-General Sir William Rollo

The post was then re-designated as the Chief of Defence Personnel and later renamed as the Chief of Defence People.

Deputy Chief of the Defence Staff (Financial and Military Capability)
These were:
Deputy Chief of the Defence Staff (Operational Requirements)
1967 – 1968 Air Marshal Sir Neil Wheeler
1968 – 1971 Lieutenant-General Sir Noel Thomas
1971 – 1973 Vice-Admiral Sir Ian McIntosh
1973 – 1976 Air Marshal Sir Michael Giddings
1976 – 1978 Lieutenant-General Sir Hugh Cunningham
1978 – 1981 Vice-Admiral Sir Stephen Berthon
1981 – 1983 Lieutenant-General Sir Maurice Johnston

Deputy Chief of the Defence Staff (Systems)
1983 – 1986 Air Marshal Sir Donald Hall
1986 – 1989 Vice-Admiral Sir Jeremy Black 
1989 – 1992 Lieutenant-General Sir Anthony Mullens
1992 – 1994 Air Marshal Sir Roger Austin

Deputy Chief of the Defence Staff (Equipment Capability)
1994 – 1995 Vice-Admiral Malcolm Rutherford

Deputy Chief of the Defence Staff (Systems)
1995 – 1997 Vice-Admiral Sir John Dunt
1997 – 1999 Lieutenant-General Sir Edmund Burton

Deputy Chief of the Defence Staff (Equipment Capability)
1999 – 2002 Vice-Admiral Sir Jeremy Blackham
2002 – 2003 Air Marshal Sir Jock Stirrup
2003 – 2006 Lieutenant-General Sir Robert Fulton
2006 – 2009 Lieutenant-General Andrew Figgures
2009 – 2012 Vice-Admiral Sir Paul Lambert

Deputy Chief of the Defence Staff (Military Capability)
2012 – 2016 Air Marshal Sir Stephen Hillier
2016 – 2018 Lieutenant General Mark Poffley

Current title: Deputy Chief of the Defence Staff (Financial and Military Capability)
2018 – 2022 Air Marshal Richard Knighton
2022 – present Lieutenant General Robert Magowan

Deputy Chiefs of the Defence Staff (Intelligence)
1964 – 1965 Vice-Admiral Sir Norman Denning
1965 – 1968 Air Marshal Sir Harold Maguire
1968 – 1971 Lieutenant-General Sir Richard Fyffe
1971 – 1972 Vice-Admiral Sir Louis Le Bailly
1972 – 1975 Lieutenant-General Sir David Willison 
1975 – 1978 Air Marshal Sir Richard Wakeford 
1978 – 1981 Vice-Admiral Sir Roy Halliday
1981 – 1983 Lieutenant-General Sir James Glover 
1983 – 1984 Air Marshal Sir Michael Armitage
''(post discontinued in 1984; taken over by Chief of Defence Intelligence)

References

British military appointments